is a former Japanese football player. His elder brother Naoto is also a former footballer.

Playing career
Otake was born in Shizuoka Prefecture on August 31, 1971. After graduating from Juntendo University, he joined Japan Football League club Cerezo Osaka in 1994. He played several matches from first season. Cerezo won the champions in 1994 and was promoted to J1 League. Although he played several matches in 1995, he could not play at all in the match in 1996 and retired end of 1996 season.

Club statistics

References

External links

1971 births
Living people
Juntendo University alumni
Association football people from Shizuoka Prefecture
Japanese footballers
J1 League players
Japan Football League (1992–1998) players
Cerezo Osaka players
Association football defenders